The Swimming competition at the 4th Pan American Games was held in São Paulo, Brazil during the Games' run in 1963. It consisted of 16 long course (50m) events: 8 for males and 8 for females.

In these Games, the U.S. earned all gold medals that were in dispute in swimming. 

Venezuela won for the first time a medal, a bronze in the women's 4x100m medley relay.

Results

Men

Women

Medal table

References